Ruy Pérez Ponce de León or Rodrigo Pérez Ponce de León (b. ? - d. 1295)  was a Spanish noble of the House of Ponce de León, in the service of the Kingdom of Castile. He was the 15th Grand Master of the Order of Calatrava from 1284 to 1295 under King Sancho IV of Castile and  further served as Mayordomo Mayor del Rey from 1293 - 1295, also under Sancho IV.

Family origins 

Ruy was the son of the Count of Cabrera, Pedro Ponce de Cabrera and his wife, Aldonza Alfonso de León, one of the illegitimate daughters of Alfonso IX of Leon and Aldonza Martínez de Silva. One of his brothers was :es:Fernán Pérez Ponce de León I.

Biography 

Prior to his election to grand master, he was the Comendador militar of Alcañiz for the Order of Calatrava. He was elected to grand master in 1284, succeeding Juan González (served 1267-1284). After the death of his brother, Fernán Pérez in 1292, the king, Sancho IV of Castile charged Ruy Perez with the guardianship of his son, the future King Ferdinand IV of Castile, a charge that had previously been under the charge of his late brother.

Later in 1292, Ruy was in the vicinity of Tarifa with King Sancho IV. He was there given eventual lordship over the city after its conquest from the Moors.

Death 

Ruy died in 1295, two days after being injured in the Battle of Iznalloz against the forces of the Kingdom of Granada under Muhammad II, in a small town of the same name north of Granada.

See also 
 Order of Calatrava
 List of Grand Masters of the Order of Calatrava

References

Bibliography

External links
 

Year of birth missing
1295 deaths
Spanish untitled nobility
Grand Masters of the Order of Calatrava